Stefania Dalla Valle (born 12 July 1966) is an Italian former professional tennis player.

Dalla Valle competed on the professional tour in the 1980s and reached a career high single ranking of 214 in the world. All of her WTA Tour main draw appearances came in 1988, at the Athens Trophy, Belgian Open and Clarins Open. She featured in the qualifying draw for the 1989 French Open.

ITF finals

Singles: 2 (0–2)

Doubles: 2 (1–1)

References

External links
 
 

1966 births
Living people
Italian female tennis players
20th-century Italian women